Monte Carmelo is one of the 20 municipalities of the state of Trujillo, Venezuela. The municipality occupies an area of 386 km2 with a population of 16,174 inhabitants according to the 2011 census.

Parishes
The municipality consists of the following three parishes:

Buena Vista
Monte Carmelo
Santa María del Horcón

References

Municipalities of Trujillo (state)